Hannover Zoo:

Hannover-Zoo is the name of a district of the city of Hanover.
Hanover Zoo is the name of the zoo in Hanover.